Sylvain Girard (born October 3, 1975) is a retired professional Canadian football wide receiver who played eight seasons for the Montreal Alouettes of the Canadian Football League. He won a Grey Cup championship with the Alouettes in 2002. Girard announced his retirement from professional football on February 28, 2007. He is now working at the College Sainte-Anne and coaches football. He played CIS football for the Concordia Stingers.

References

External links
CFL.ca Bio

1975 births
Concordia Stingers football players
French Quebecers
Living people
Montreal Alouettes players
Players of Canadian football from Quebec
Sportspeople from Saguenay, Quebec